Santa Subdivision  is a town and commune in Cameroon. Santa township comprises the villages Akum,Alatening, Santa, Meforbe, Pinyin, Bamock, Njong,  Mbei, Awing, Baligham, Baba II, Mbu and Baforchu. Santa was founded in 1922 by Chai Boma.

See also
Communes of Cameroon

References
 Site de la primature - Élections municipales 2002 
 Contrôle de gestion et performance des services publics communaux des villes camerounaises - Thèse de Donation Avele, Université Montesquieu Bordeaux IV 
 Charles Nanga, La réforme de l’administration territoriale au Cameroun à la lumière de la loi constitutionnelle n° 96/06 du 18 janvier 1996, Mémoire ENA. 

Communes of Northwest Region (Cameroon)